James Holmes (born 4 May 1973) is a former professional tennis player from Australia.

Biography
Holmes, who is originally from Sydney, attended the Australian Institute of Sport in Canberra. During his junior career, Holmes formed a doubles partnership with Paul Kilderry which took them to the boys' doubles semi-finals at the 1990 Wimbledon Championships, the final of the 1991 Australian Open, followed by quarter-finals at the 1991 French Open and 1991 Wimbledon Championships.

On the professional circuit, Holmes competed in the men's doubles main draw of every Australian Open from 1995 to 1998. He also played doubles at the 1998 Wimbledon Championships with Andrew Painter and made the second round. 

At ATP Tour level he featured in the doubles events of 11 tournaments, all across 1997 and 1998. He also won a total of three Challenger titles, one in Bronx, New York and the others in Perth.

Presently, Holmes is a real estate agent in Palm Beach, Queensland.

Junior Grand Slam finals

Doubles: 1 (1 runner-up)

ATP Challenger and ITF Futures finals

Doubles: 6 (3–3)

References

External links
 
 

1973 births
Living people
Australian male tennis players
Tennis players from Sydney
Australian Institute of Sport tennis players
20th-century Australian people